The UAE Derby is a Group 2 flat horse race in the United Arab Emirates for three-year-old thoroughbreds run over a distance of 1,900 metres (approximately 9.5 furlongs) on dirt at Meydan Racecourse in Dubai.  It takes place annually during the Dubai World Cup Night on the last Saturday in March.

It was first run in 2000 and attained Group 2 status two years later.  The distance of the race was increased to 2,000 metres (10 furlongs) in 2002, before reverting to 1,800 metres in 2004, and increased again to 1,900 meters in 2010.  The race is open to both Northern and Southern Hemisphere three-year-olds.

The UAE Derby currently offers a purse of US$2.5 million. From 2013, the race receives Kentucky Derby points and is now considered a major preparatory race for the Kentucky Derby.

Records
Speed  record:
 1:47.04 – Express Tour (At former distance of 1,800 metres)
 1:55.18 – Mendelssohn (over current distance of 1,900 metres)

Most wins by an owner:
 9 – Godolphin Racing (2000, 2001, 2002, 2005, 2006, 2009, 2011, 2017, 2021)

Most wins by a jockey:
 3 – Christophe Soumillon (2010, 2015, 2017)

Most wins by a trainer:
 8 – Saeed bin Suroor (2000, 2001, 2002, 2005, 2006, 2009, 2011, 2017)

Winners

Lines of Battle was later renamed Helene Super Star

See also
Road to the Kentucky Derby
 List of United Arab Emirates horse races

References
Racing Post:
 ,  

Flat horse races for three-year-olds
Triple Crown Prep Races
Horse races in the United Arab Emirates
Nad Al Sheba Racecourse
Recurring sporting events established in 2000
2000 establishments in the United Arab Emirates